Year of the dog(s) may refer to:

 Dog (zodiac), an animal in the 12-year cycle of Chinese astrology
 Year of the Dog (album), a 1994 album by Wolfstone
 "Year of the Dog" (Hart to Hart), an episode of Hart to Hart
 "Year of the Dog" (The Loop), an episode of The Loop
 The Year of the Dog (film), a 1994 Russian drama by Semyon Aranovich
 Year of the Dogs, a 1997 documentary about an Australian-rules football team
 Year of the Dog (film), a 2007 American comedy-drama by Mike White
 Year of the Dog... Again, a 2006 album by DMX

See also
 Dog years (disambiguation)